Borsonella callicesta is a species of sea snail, a marine gastropod mollusk in the family Borsoniidae.

Description
The small shell is white, covered with an olivaceous periostracum, and with four whorls exclusive of an apical whorl or two (which in the specimens is always eroded). The suture is distinct. The edge of the whorl in front of it is slightly thickened. The spiral sculpture on the upper whorls consists of a somewhat blunt peripheral keel, undulated more or less toward the apex and obsolete on the body whorl. Other sculpture consists of minute, broken, irregular, more or less oblique, usually punctate impressed lines. The aperture is simple. The outer lip is sharp. The body of the shell is erased and white. The siphonal canal is short, somewhat recurved

The height of four whorls, 15 mm; of the body whorl, 10 mm; diameter of the shell: 7 mm.

Distribution
This species occurs in the Pacific Ocean off San Diego, California, Mexico and in the Gulf of Panama.

References

 Tucker, J.K. 2004 Catalog of recent and fossil turrids (Mollusca: Gastropoda). Zootaxa 682:1–1295.

External links

callicesta
Gastropods described in 1902